Love and Larceny (in Italian, Il mattatore, "The Showman") is a 1960  Italian  comedy film directed by Dino Risi. It was entered into the 10th Berlin International Film Festival.

Plot
Gerardo is an aspiring actor, trying unsuccessfully to cross over from comedy to tragedy. Due to his ability to mimic dialects of Italy, he is involved in a scam concocted by Lallo against a rich cloth-merchant. His inexperience resulted in he is the only one to be arrested and sentenced to several months in prison. There he encounters a vast array of petty criminals, devoted primarily to scams of various kinds. He befriends Chinotto, a con man for whom the doors of the prisons are like "revolving doors of a large hotel."

Cast
 Vittorio Gassman as  Gerardo Latini
 Peppino De Filippo as  De Rosa, aka "Chinotto" 
 Dorian Gray as  Elena
 Anna Maria Ferrero as  Annalisa Rauseo
 Mario Carotenuto as  Lallo Cortina
 Alberto Bonucci as  Gloria Patri
 Fosco Giachetti as  General Benito Mesci
 Luigi Pavese as  The industrialist
 Nando Bruno as  Owner of restaurant
 Linda Sini as  Laura, wife of Chinotto

References

External links 
 

1960 films
Films set in Italy
Films set in Rome
1960s Italian-language films
1960 comedy films
Italian black-and-white films
Films directed by Dino Risi
Films about con artists
Films with screenplays by Age & Scarpelli
Films with screenplays by Ruggero Maccari
Italian comedy films
1960s Italian films